John Eric Adair (born 18 May 1934) is a British academic who is a leadership theorist and author of more than forty books (translated into eighteen languages) on business, military and other leadership.

Life
Adair was born in Luton and educated at St Paul's School before undertaking his national service as a second lieutenant in the Scots Guards from 1953 to 1955.  Unusually, he served as adjutant of a Bedouin regiment in the Arab Legion and was briefly in command of the garrison of Jerusalem in the front line. He also studied at Hull Nautical College (where he qualified as an Arctic trawler deckhand in 1955) and Trinity Hall, Cambridge, obtaining his Bachelor of Arts degree in 1959.  He later obtained a doctorate from King's College London in 1966 and a BLitt degree from Jesus College, Oxford in 1971.  He became a Fellow of the Royal Historical Society in 1966.  After working as a senior lecturer at the Royal Military Academy, Sandhurst from 1961 to 1967, he later worked for the Industrial Society before becoming professor of leadership studies at the University of Surrey in 1979, a post he held until 1984.  He was a visiting professor at the University of Exeter from 1990 to 2000.  He is currently an emeritus fellow of the Windsor Leadership Trust, where he regularly speaks on leadership development programmes. Since 2006, he has been honorary professor of leadership at the China Executive Leadership Academy in Pudong. In 2009 he was appointed chair of leadership studies, United Nations System Staff College in Turin. He is president of Adair International.

Bibliography

See also 
Functional leadership model

References

External links 
 John Adair's website
 John's Adair International website
 Overview of Adairs Action Centered Leadership

1934 births
Living people
People educated at St Paul's School, London
Alumni of Trinity Hall, Cambridge
Alumni of King's College London
Military personnel from Bedfordshire
Alumni of Jesus College, Oxford
Academics of the University of Surrey
Academics of the University of Exeter
Fellows of the Royal Historical Society
British business theorists
Motivation theorists
Scots Guards officers
Academics of the Royal Military Academy Sandhurst